The North American Hockey League (NAHL) was a low-level minor professional ice hockey league that existed from 1973 to 1977. Several of the NAHL teams operated as developmental ("farm") teams for World Hockey Association franchises. The NAHL was one of two leagues, along with the Southern Hockey League, that were formed after the Eastern Hockey League ceased operations in 1973. The Lockhart Cup was the league's championship trophy. With the loss of a number of franchises, the NAHL elected to fold in September 1977.

The league served as the inspiration for the film Slap Shot. Ned Dowd, who played for the Johnstown Jets, was the brother of the film's screenwriter, Nancy Dowd. Ned played for Johnstown during a season where the team was for sale, when his sister came to live in Johnstown and was inspired to write the screenplay. The film contains references to "Syracuse" and "Broome County", which were teams in the NAHL. Some of the incidents depicted actually occurred in actual NAHL games.

Teams

Lockhart Cup

The championship trophy of the North American Hockey League was named the Lockhart Cup in honor of Tommy Lockhart, founder of the Eastern Hockey League. The trophy was last awarded on April 10, 1977, to the Syracuse Blazers, and has since gone missing. The Hockey Hall of Fame stated that the Lockhart Cup is one of "about three historical trophies that have disappeared". Its last known whereabouts was reported to be in the basement of Danny Belisle, the coach of the Blazers in the 1976–77 season.

References

External links
 Encyclopedia of the North American Hockey League Blog
 Teams and standings

 
Defunct ice hockey leagues in the United States
Defunct ice hockey leagues in Canada
World Hockey Association
1973 establishments in North America
1977 disestablishments in North America
Sports leagues established in 1973
Sports leagues disestablished in 1977